Chinenye Chidera "CC" Uche (born March 3, 1998) is an American professional soccer player who currently plays for MLS Next Pro side Minnesota United 2.

Career

Youth 
Uche played as part of the Georgia United academy during their 2014–15 season. Uche also spent time in South America training with River Plate in Argentina and O'Higgins in Chile.

College & Amateur 
In 2016, Uche attended Duke University to play college soccer. Uche appeared in 18 games for the Blue Devils, but only played 3-minutes of soccer in his 2017 season. In 2018, Uche transferred to Ohio State University, starting every game of the season during his junior season, but only playing 4 games in 2019 before suffering a season-ending leg injury.

During 2018, Uche also played in the USL PDL with Chicago FC United, appearing in 9 regular season games and making 3 playoff appearances.

Professional
On January 21, 2021, Uche was selected 41st overall in the 2021 MLS SuperDraft by Los Angeles FC. On April 5, 2021, it was announced that Uche had signed with Los Angeles FC's USL Championship affiliate side Las Vegas Lights.

On March 3, 2022, Uche signed as a free agent with MLS Next Pro side Minnesota United 2 ahead of their inaugural season.

References

External links

UNLV bio
Ohio State bio

1998 births
American soccer players
Association football defenders
Chicago FC United players
Duke Blue Devils men's soccer players
Las Vegas Lights FC players
Living people
Los Angeles FC draft picks
Ohio State Buckeyes men's soccer players
People from Lawrenceville, Georgia
Soccer players from Georgia (U.S. state)
USL Championship players
USL League Two players
MLS Next Pro players